The El Paso Raiders are a defunct professional ice hockey team which played in the Southwest Hockey League during the 1975–76 season. Based in El Paso, Texas, the team played its home games out of the El Paso County Coliseum.

On January 24, 1976, after playing just 37 games, the team announced it was relocating to Minot, North Dakota to play out the remainder of the season as the Minot Raiders.

References

Sports in El Paso, Texas
Defunct ice hockey teams in Texas
1975 establishments in Texas
1976 disestablishments in Texas
Ice hockey clubs established in 1975
Ice hockey clubs disestablished in 1976